Asieh Ahmadi (born 5 June 1983 in Tehran) is an Iranian daf, dayereh and tanbur player. She is the sister of Sara Ahmadi. 
Ahmadi has made numerous recordings with prominent musicians including Abdolhossein Mokhtabad, Nasser Razazi, Pari Zanganeh and Simin Ghanem, and is a member of the Musical groups Hannaneh and Toranj.

References

1983 births
Living people
Iranian musicologists
Iranian composers
Daf players
Dayereh players
Tanbur players
Musicians from Tehran
Persian classical musicians
21st-century drummers